Paul D. Spudis (1952–2018) was an American geologist and lunar scientist. His specialty was the study of volcanism and impact processes on the planets, including Mercury and Mars. 

Spudis was well known as a leading advocate of a return to the Moon to use its resources to establish and supply a cislunar space transportation system.

Early life and education
In 1976 he earned a B.S. in geology at the Arizona State University. Following his graduation he spent several months working with Dr. Ronald Greeley at Ames Research Center studying various aspects of Lunar and Martian geology, before transitioning to an internship at the Jet Propulsion Laboratory, during the Mars landing of that year. The following year he went to Brown University to study planetary geology, with a focus on the Moon. A year later he earned his master's degree and moved back to Arizona where he started working for Dr. Greeley who had just joined the faculty at Arizona State University. In 1982 he earned a PhD in geology at the university.

Early career
After graduation, he went to work for the U.S. Geological Survey. In the following years he spent in lunar studies and promoting the idea of lunar exploration. He became a principal investigator at the NASA Office of Space Science, Solar System Exploration Division, planetary geology program. He later joined Lunar and Planetary Institute in Houston as a staff scientist.

Later career
Eventually Spudis joined the Johns Hopkins University Applied Physics Laboratory, and became senior staff scientist. He returned to the Lunar and Planetary Institute in Houston in 2008 and was a senior staff scientist there.

He served as a member of a 1991 White House committee, the Synthesis Group, in Washington D.C. In 1994 he was the deputy leader of the Clementine mission science team. He also served on numerous science advisory committees. At Johns Hopkins’ Applied Physics Laboratory he developed an imaging radar system for the Indian mission to the Moon, Chandrayaan-1. He was a member of the 2004 Presidential Commission on the Implementation of United States Space Exploration Policy. He was a team member of the Mini-RF experiment on NASA's Lunar Reconnaissance Orbiter mission.

Personal life
Spudis was born in Kentucky to Mattie Wren.

He was married to Anne M. Seaborne until his death.

Spudis died on 29 August 2018 of complications from lung cancer.

Honors
In 2016 the American Society of Civil Engineers awarded him the Columbia Medal.

The inner main-belt asteroid 7560 Spudis is named in honor of Paul Spudis.

A crater on the moon called Spudis is also named after him. This crater is next to the famous Shackleton crater on the south polar region of the Moon, which has been an area of particular interest for future lunar landing missions.

References

Bibliography
Complete bibliography at 

Books
 
 

  

  

 

 , 

Papers

External links
 

 
 
 
 

1952 births
2018 deaths
American geologists
Planetary scientists
Arizona State University alumni
Space advocates
Brown University alumni
People from Bowling Green, Kentucky